The bills of the 18th Congress of the Philippines list includes proposed laws that were introduced in the 18th Congress of the Philippines. This Congress will last from July 22, 2019 until the next elections on 2022.

The Congress of the Philippines is the bicameral legislature of the Republic of the Philippines consisting of two chambers: the lower chamber known as the House of Representatives and the upper chamber known as the Senate. The House of Representatives and the Senate are equal partners in the legislative process, which means that bills introduced in either chamber cannot become law unless passed by both. The bills listed below are arranged on the basis of which chamber they were first introduced in, and then chronologically by date.

Introduced in the House of Representatives

Bills

Introduced in the Senate

References

External links 
Official Website of the Senate
Official Website of the House of Representatives

 
Philippines politics-related lists